Akdere (literally "white creek"), also spelled Ağdərə or Agdara or Agdere, is a Turkic place name and may refer to:
Akdere, Adıyaman, a village in Adıyaman Province, Turkey
Akdere, Nallıhan, a village in Ankara Province, Turkey
Akdere, Hopa, a village in Artvin Province, Turkey
Akdere, Silifke, a town in Mersin Province, Turkey
Ağdərə, Khizi, a village in Khizi Rayon, Azerbaijan
Ağdərə, Nakhchivan, a village in Azerbaijan
Akdere, Silvan
Akdere, Sungurlu
Ağdərə, Tartar, a town in Azerbaijan also known as Mardakert
Ağdərə, Tovuz, a village in Tovuz Rayon, Azerbaijan
Akdere, Yenişehir, Turkey
Mardakert (town), also known as Ağdərə
Byala, Varna Province, historically known as Akdere, Bulgaria
Valea Albă, a village in Romania

See also
Karadere (disambiguation)